Ephysteris unica is a moth in the family Gelechiidae. It was described by Povolný in 1971. It is found in Algeria.

References

Ephysteris
Moths described in 1971